

Gmina Bukowsko is a rural gmina (administrative district) in Sanok County, Subcarpathian Voivodeship, in south-eastern Poland.

Sołectwos

Ethnic Groups
Poles

Hiking trails 
European walking route E8
  Iwonicz-Zdrój – Rymanów-Zdrój - Puławy – Tokarnia (778 m) – Przybyszów – Kamień (717 m) – Komańcza - Prełuki – Duszatyn – Jeziorka Duszatyńskie –  (997 m)     – Wołosań (1071 m) – Cisna - Połonina Caryńska – Szeroki Wierch – Rozsypaniec (1282 m)–  Halicz – Przełęcz Bukowska -  Tarnica – Ustrzyki Górne  –  Wołosate.

Historical rural commune
Gerichts-Bezirk of Austria-Hungary until 1918:

Neighbouring gminas
Gmina Bukowsko is bordered by the gminas of Komańcza, Rymanów, Sanok, Zagórz and Zarszyn.

Literature
 Prof. Adam Fastnacht.  Slownik Historyczno-Geograficzny Ziemi Sanockiej w Średniowieczu (Historic-Geographic Dictionary of the Sanok District in the Middle Ages), Kraków, 2002, .
Jerzy Zuba "W Gminie Bukowsko". Roksana, 2004, . Translated by Deborah Greenlee. Arlington, TX 76016.

References
Polish official population figures 2006

Bukowsko
Sanok County